Shoresy is a Canadian television comedy series created by and starring Jared Keeso that premiered on Crave on May 13, 2022. A spinoff of Letterkenny, the series focuses on the titular character of Shoresy (Keeso) as he moves to Sudbury to take a role with a struggling Triple A-level ice hockey team, the Sudbury Bulldogs.

In the United States, the series premiered on Hulu on May 27, 2022.

A second season was announced in January 2023 which is set to premiere later in the year.

Plot
After losing 20 straight games and running dead last in the four-team Triple A-level Northern Ontario Senior Hockey Organization (NOSHO), the Sudbury Bulldogs are faced with being completely shut down. Veteran player Shore ("Shoresy") in an attempt to save the team makes a bet with team general manager that the team will never lose again if he's given a chance to take control. With the help of new coach Sanguinet, a roster of new players, and the dissolution of the team on the line, Shoresy sets out to prove that the Bulldogs can play as a team, get bums in seats, and make a name for themselves.

Cast

Main
 Jared Keeso as "Shoresy" Shore (known as "Waffle" by his foster family)
 Tasya Teles as Nat
 Harlan Blayne Kytwayhat as Sanguinet
 Blair Lamora as Ziigwan
 Keilani Rose as Miigwan
 Jonathan Diaby as himself, "Dolo"
 Terry Ryan as Ted Hitchcock
 Ryan McDonell as Mark Michaels

Recurring
 Max Bouffard as Jean-Jacques François Jacques-Jean "JJ Frankie JJ"
 Andrew Antsanen as Brant "Goody" Goodleaf
 Camille Sullivan as Laura Mohr
 Laurence Leboeuf as Herself
 Jon Mirasty as Jim #1
 Brandon Nolan as Jim #2
 Jordan Nolan as Jim #3
 Keegan Long as Liam
 Bourke Cazabon as Cory
 Jon Ambrose as Phil

Guests
 Scott Thompson as Shoresy's foster father
 Jonathan Torrens as Remy Nadeau
 Jacob Tierney as Benoit "Benny" Brodeur
 Kim Cloutier as Anik Archambault
 Eliana Jones as Mercedes
 Tessa Bonhomme as herself
 Jay Onrait as himself
 Brian "Rear Admiral" McGonagall as himself
 Lysandre Nadeau as herself

Production and development
Shoresy is played by Jared Keeso, but within Letterkenny he is only seen in contexts that obscured his face as Keeso simultaneously plays the leading role of Wayne. Justin Stockman of Bell Media explained the decision to proceed with a Shoresy spinoff by noting that he is one of the most popular characters in Letterkenny merchandising, and acknowledging the creative potential involved in building on the story of a character about whom very little is known in the original show.

Production on the series launched in November 2021 in Sudbury. Production locations have included the Sudbury Arena.

During the tenth-season Letterkenny episode "VidVok", Tanis explains to Wayne that she managed to get Shore a position on the Sudbury Bulldogs and will be moving soon, setting up the Shoresy series. The show's first teaser trailer was released in February 2022.

Like Letterkenny, the show has received praise for its efforts to include fully rounded and nuanced portrayals of its First Nations characters, which was accomplished in part by including actress Kaniehtiio Horn, who plays Tanis in the original Letterkenny, as a producer tasked in part with ensuring that the indigenous characters were written and portrayed realistically. The series has also received positive notice for inverting the stereotypical gender dynamics in hockey by placing women in power positions as the team's manager, her two assistants and the sports journalist who covers the team for the Sudbury Star, noting that in Letterkenny "Part of the secret ... is that although the men seem to be the focal point of the story and the women seem to be objectified in endless slo-mo walk-ups, the men are all trapped in different stages of arrested development and the women are truly in charge."

Episodes

Critical response
In advance of the series premiere, John Doyle of The Globe and Mail praised the show, writing that "In the spirit of Letterkenny, the humour is funny, mad, droll, childish and spiky. Full of salty Canadian vernacular, it soars. There are more visual jokes than you might find in the average episode of Letterkenny, but the flavour is the familiar tone of boldly irreverent, and it is sometimes slashing satire with more puns than you can count. In an expected but delightful way, Shoresy is Letterkenny refreshed. Who knew that a series which opened some years ago with the line, 'A coupla hockey players came up the lane way the other day,' could eventually unleash this great spinoff."

Daniel Fienberg of The Hollywood Reporter described the series as essentially an updated version of the 1977 film Slap Shot, praising it both for humanizing Shoresy and for placing women and First Nations characters in positions of strength.

Michael Hollett of NEXT Magazine wrote that Shoresy is "a fastpaced show with a more linear narrative and explicit plot than Letterkenny", and praised it for lacking the stiffness and awkwardness that often plagues television series about hockey.

References

External links
 Shoresy on Crave
 Shoresy on Hulu
 

2022 Canadian television series debuts
2020s Canadian sitcoms
Crave original programming
Television shows filmed in Greater Sudbury
2020s Canadian sports television series
Canadian television spin-offs
Television shows set in Greater Sudbury
Ice hockey television series
Television series by Bell Media
Television series by DHX Media